Azochis gripusalis is a moth in the family Crambidae. It was described by Francis Walker in 1859. It is found in Brazil.

The wings are semihyaline (almost glasslike) with a testaceous tinge. There are three blackish transverse lines on the forewings. There are some black spots on the hindwings.

References

Moths described in 1859
Spilomelinae
Moths of South America